Jakob S. Boeskov is an artist based in New York.
His work has been shown in museums such as New Museum and Stedelijk Museum. He is best known for infiltrating a Chinese weapons fair with his ID Sniper project but has also worked with music and film.

ID Sniper 
In 2002, Boeskov and industrial designer Kristian Von Bengtson created a fake hi-tech weapon called the ID Sniper rifle. This fictive weapon could shoot off GPS chips into demonstrators so that the police later could locate them and "apply the punishment." Boeskov brought drawings of this weapon to a weapons fair in Beijing, China, where the weapon received positive reactions from real weapons dealers, politicians and policemen.
Boeskov described the project "like being a sci-fi writer caught in his own novel" 
The project received much press and caused Boeskov to receive purchase orders from various security agencies from around the world.

Film and video work 
In 2009 Boeskov wrote and directed the film Empire North which won the 2010 Danish:DOX Award  at the CPH:DOX film festival. In 2010 Boeskov collaborated with Creative Time in New York with a video created in Nigeria together with director Teco Benson.

Filmography 

 Empire North (Interpretation Productions, 2010) 
 Roy Camera (Ada Lauder Films, 2022)

Discography

Albums
 Symbolic And Real Police (2017, S.I.  Records)
 Lord Algorithm (2022, TapeLore)

EPs
 I Think I Scan (2012, w. Timothy DeWit of Gang Gang Dance, Pork Salad Press)

Chinese hacker attack 
On June 4, 2009, on the 20th anniversary of the Tiananmen Square protests, Boeskov's website was hacked and infiltrated with malware by Chinese hackers, most likely the Honker Union. This cyberwarfare happened at the same time as Operation Aurora, a series of coordinated cyber-attacks on Google and other American companies.

References 

Living people
Danish artists
1973 births
Danish people of Icelandic descent